Biagi can refer to :

 Carlo Biagi (1914–1986), an Italian football (soccer) player who competed in the 1936 Summer Olympics
 Enzo Biagi (1920–2007), an Italian journalist and writer
 George Biagi (born 1985), an Italian/Scottish rugby union player
 Giuseppe Biagi (explorer) (1897-1965), an Italian soldier, explorer and radio operator
 Giuseppe Biagi (painter) (born 1949), an Italian painter and member of the Metacosa Movement
 Marco Biagi (1950–2002), an Italian jurist
 Marco Biagi (born 1982), a Scottish politician
 Maria Luisa Altieri Biagi (1930-2017), an Italian scholar and writer
 Mattia Biagi (born 1974), an Italian professional artist
 Paolo Biagi (born 1948), an Italian archaeologist
 Pete Biagi (born 1963), a cinematographer
 Rodolfo Biagi (1906–1969), an Argentine Tango musician
 Thomas Biagi (born 1976), a professional racecar driver from Italy